Princess Sita Devi of Pithapuram (formerly Queen of Baroda) (born 12 May 1917, Madras, India - died 15 February 1989, Paris, France) was known as the "Indian Wallis Simpson". She was a member of the international jet set.

Biography 
Sita Devi was the daughter of the Maharaja of Pithapuram – Sri Raja Rao Venkata Kumara Mahipati Surya Rau Bahadur Garu and his wife Sri Rani Chinnamamba Devi (of Kapileswarapuram, Nuzvid Zamindari).

Sita Devi first married Meka Rangaiah Appa Rao Bahadur, Zamindar of Vuyyuru. They had a son, Rajah M. Viduth Kumar Apparao. She was a close friend of Princess Niloufer, daughter-in-law of the 7th Nizam of Hyderabad.

She met her second husband, Pratap Singh Gaekwar of Baroda, at the Madras horse races in 1943. The Gaekwad was, at that time, considered the eighth richest man in the world. It was also reported that he was the second richest Indian prince. The Gaekwad subsequently began a romantic relationship with Sita Devi. The lovers consulted with his legal team. The lawyers recommended that the Hindu Sita Devi convert to Mohammedanism. That would dissolve her marriage to the Zamindar under Indian law. She embraced Islam. 

The Gaekwad took her as his second wife in 1943, which caused consternation with the British authorities, as this violated the antibigamy laws that the previous Gaekwad of Baroda enacted. The British Viceroy in New Delhi summoned the Gaekwad to contest this marriage. The latter argued that the law applied to the subjects of Baroda, and that he being their monarch was exempt from this law. This was confirmed by the Viceroy's legal advisers. The British government accepted the marriage, but did not refer to the Maharani as "Her Highness" as was the protocol for the consorts of rulers of princely states.

In 1946, the Gaekwad took his second wife on a tour of Europe. The reason for their visit was to find a suitable residence away from India. They found that the independent principality of Monaco was a suitable place to set up their second home. They bought a mansion in Monte Carlo and the Maharani took up permanent residence there. 

The Gaekwad visited often, bringing some of the great treasures of Baroda to Monaco. The Maharani became the custodian of these treasures.

The couple also made two trips to the United States after the war. They went on a spending spree, buying all types of luxurious items. It was widely reported they spent $10 million on one of those trips. Indian officials audited the principality's finances. They concluded the Gaekwad had taken several large interest-free loans from the Baroda treasury. They demanded that these be returned. The prince complied by making several payments from his $8 million-a-year income.

The princely couple transferred a copious amount from the Baroda treasury, including some of its most famous jewellery, including four celebrated pearl carpets, a famed seven-strand necklace of priceless pearls (called the Baroda pearls), a three-strand diamond necklace with the famous Pink Brazilian Star of the South  diamond and the English Dresden  diamond. The princely couple also had custody of the Empress Eugenie diamond. When Baroda was integrated into the newly independent India, Indian officials were eventually able to recover some of the items, but some of the jewels had been transferred to the Maharani's ownership.

In 1965, she purchased a painting in Paris from Daniel Wildenstein, believing it to be La Poésie by François Boucher. When it was discovered to be a fake, she sued Wildenstein in an English court despite both her and him residing in France. The case, Maharanee of Baroda v Wildenstein, established an important rule regarding the presence of a defendant in conflict of laws.

Years after the Maharani's death some of the precious items were discovered. In 1994 the pearl carpet was found in a Geneva vault. It was sold to an Arab prince for $31 million. Currently this carpet is displayed at the Museum of Islamic Art, Doha, in Qatar, even though it was commissioned by an Indian Hindu Maharaja and not by an Islamic ruler. The Star of the South and other gems were located with jewellers in Amsterdam.

After the Maharani's death, a part of her inheritance was transferred to her niece (daughter of Rani Manjula Devi of the Sidli family) Anangarekha Devi who currently lives in Assam with her family.

Eventually, India, due to the discrepancies and possible fraud, deposed the Gaekwad in 1951 and his eldest son by his first wife succeeded him. Technically, the couple were not heads of state any longer, but they insisted on still being referred to by their former titles.

She bore Gaekwad one child, a son, Sayaji Rao Gaekwad (8 March 1945 – 8 May 1985). Nicknamed "Princie", he was the apple of her eye. She attended exclusive events and partied with other international luminaries, such as Aristotle Onassis.

In 1953, she sold a pair of bejewelled anklets to Harry Winston. They had several large emeralds and diamonds. The jeweller set these stones into a spectacular necklace that was bought by the Wallis, Duchess of Windsor. The Duchess wore this to a 1957 New York ball also attended by Sita Devi. When other guests were admiring the necklace. The Maharani was heard to exclaim that those jewels looked just as nice on her feet. The embarrassed Duchess returned the necklace to Winston. 

The Maharani was a car enthusiast and was reportedly very fond of her Mercedes W126, which was custom made for her by Mercedes-Benz. At the 1969 Ascot Gold Cup she invited guests to touch the  sapphire on her right hand for good luck. Esquire Magazine included Sita Devi and Princie on its list of "fun couples" for 1969. Sita Devi divorced the Gaekwad in 1956. He promptly moved to London.

After the dissolution of her second marriage, she clung to her exalted title. Her Rolls-Royce still sported the armorial insignia of Baroda. She would reminisce about the days when she was a Queen and received 101-gun salutes. Prince Rainier awarded citizenship of Monaco to both Sita Devi and Princie. 

She maintained a Paris apartment as well. She continued to live in grand style, drinking Baron de Rothschild's Bordeaux, rearranging her Louis XVI furniture and attending exclusive parties. When travelling she brought along a large wardrobe, reported to be a thousand saris, hundreds of pairs of shoes and of course her jewellery. But her finances were eventually reduced enough for her to secretly auction some of her beloved jewels in 1974.

The Maharani suffered a tragedy in 1985, when Princie died at age committed suicide at age 40. His death was attributed to alcoholism and drug addiction. Sita Devi died four years later of natural causes.

Titles
1917–1935 : Her Serene Highness Maharajkumari Sita Devi of Pithapuram
1935–1943 : Her Highness Rani Sita Devi, Rani of Vuyyur
1943–1955 : Her Majesty Maharani Sita Devi, Maharani of Baroda
1955–1989 : Her Serene Highness Maharajkumari Sita Devi of Pithapuram

References

External links 
Baroda Pearl & Sita Devi
Baroda Pearl
Baroda Pearl Auction
The Star of the South
The Pearl Carpet of Baroda
Images of Pearl Carpet of Baroda
Moon of Baroda on Diamond Divas

1917 births
1989 deaths
Baroda State
History of Vadodara
Indian socialites
Indian princesses
People from East Godavari district
20th-century Indian women
20th-century Indian people